The Music Venue Trust is a British charitable organisation that was founded in January 2014 to help protect, secure and improve music venues in the United Kingdom. The MVT also operates the Music Venues Alliance, a network of venues, and offers services that help venues that are members of the MVA. Paul McCartney has spoken out in support of the MVT, saying that "If we don’t support live music at this level then the future of music in general is in danger".

Issues

One of the key reasons for the foundation of the MVT was the closure of many music venues, such as Brighton's Blind Tiger Club, due to noise complaints; this is especially important as noise complaints are becoming more frequent, as new laws have been introduced that make it easier to convert offices into housing.  Another key concern that the MVT claims is facing venues is Arts Council England's lack of funding for venues; Beverley Whitrick, Strategic Director of the MVT, said in 2017 she could not estimate how many clubs would close in the next five years.

Initiatives

The MVA founded an international affiliate organisation in Austin, Texas in 2016, targeting state taxes that are seen as punitive towards local venues as well as the MVA New Zealand where they are fighting to have Agent of Change recognised and adopted. To clarify its political aims ahead of the 2017 general election, the MVT launched a "Manifesto for Music 2017" in May of that year. Two months after the launch of the manifesto, in order to help fight the issues and closures that music venues in the UK were facing, the MVT announced that they would cooperate with Ticketweb, part of Live Nation Entertainment, to sell "Grassroots Venues Tickets", which help fund the MVT's efforts, as part of the service charge is donated to the MVT.

References

External links 
 Official website

Music charities based in the United Kingdom
Charities based in London
2014 establishments in England
Arts charities
Arts organizations established in 2004